Lime Rock Park is a natural-terrain motorsport road racing venue located in Lakeville, Connecticut, United States, a hamlet in the town of Salisbury, in the state's northwest corner. Built in 1956, it is the nation's third oldest continuously operating road racing venue, behind Road America (1955) and Willow Springs International Motorsports Park (1953).  The track is owned by Skip Barber, a former race car driver who started the Skip Barber Racing School in 1975. It was listed on the National Register of Historic Places in 2009.

History
The  Lime Rock track was originally conceived of in 1956 by Jim Vaill, who, along with John Fitch and Cornell Aeronautical Laboratory, built the track utilizing state-of-the-art road and highway safety principles of the time. The first race, a mix of G-Production class and an MG class, was held on April 28, 1957. The winner of the G-Production was Ted Sprigg in an Alfa Romeo Giulietta. The winner of the MG class was Charles Callanan in an MG TC. In 1959, Lime Rock hosted the Little Le Mans race, won by Charles Callanan and Roger Penske in a Fiat Abarth. In 2008, the track was re-paved and two new corner complexes were added.

The track has a loyal following, though it did face some resistance from the local community shortly after it opened. In 1959, the Lime Rock Protective Association, with support from the nearby Trinity Episcopal Church, took the park to Litchfield Superior Court in an effort to ban Sunday racing. The court issued a permanent injunction against Sunday racing, and its decision was upheld by the Connecticut Supreme Court. While restrictive, the carefully crafted injunction was also enabling. It preserved the track's right to conduct unmuffled sports car racing on Fridays and Saturdays, plus testing on Tuesdays and other operating benefits. The injunction stands to this day.

The track has featured many well-known racers including Paul Newman, who supported his own Newman-Haas team with Bob Sharp, Mario Andretti, Stirling Moss, Dan Gurney, Sam Posey, and Mark Donohue. Other racers have included Parnelli Jones, Joey Logano, Austin Dillon, Simon Pagenaud, Alexander Rossi, and Tom Cruise.  Posey and Newman have sections of the circuit named for them.

The Rolex Sports Car Series, American Le Mans Series and IMSA WeatherTech SportsCar Championship have used a configuration which included the chicane at turn five and West Bend.

Track
The track is a natural terrain road course, constructed over hilly terrain in the Berkshire Mountains, part of the greater Appalachian mountain range. The famous Appalachian Trail hiking route passes by the circuit on the ridge lines visible from the track a half mile to the east. The venue is somewhat unique in that it features no grandstands or bleacher seating, instead inviting fans to bring chairs and blankets and enjoy the racing from its grassy hillside areas under the shade of trees. While the venue is relatively compact, the relatively short track is renowned for its spectator experience, offering fans an up close view and close quarters racing.

For years the track was listed as being  in length—the story goes that right after it was built, somebody used the odometer in a Chevrolet to measure the track length—and 1.53 was taken as gospel. The "classic" configuration is seven turns, while the three optional layouts are eight, nine and ten turns, respectively.

Lap records
The fastest official all-time track record set during a race weekend is 43.112 seconds, set by P. J. Jones in a Toyota Eagle MkIII, during qualifying for the 1993 Toyota Trucks Lime Rock Grand Prix. The fastest official race lap records at Lime Rock Park are listed as:

Races

 Can-Am
 Formula Atlantic
 Formula Libre
 Grand-Am Continental Tire Sports Car Challenge (2006–2013)
 Lime Rock Grand Prix
 IMSA GT Championship (1972–1998)
 United States Road Racing Championship (1999)
 Grand-Am Rolex Sports Car Series (2000–2001, 2006–2008, 2010–2013)
 NASCAR K&N Pro Series East (1993–2010)
 NASCAR Whelen Modified Tour (2010–2011)
 North American Touring Car Championship (1996)
 Northeast Grand Prix
 American Le Mans Series (2004–2013)
 IMSA WeatherTech SportsCar Championship (2015–2019, 2021–present)
 Pirelli World Challenge (1992–1993, 1995–2005, 2007–2008, 2013, 2016–2018)
 SCCA Continental Championship Formula 5000 (1968–1972)
 SCCA National Sports Car Championship (1958–1964)
 Trans-Am (1967–1974, 1981, 1985–1989, 1992–1993, 1995–1999, 2002–2003, 2010, 2012–2015, 2019, 2021–present)

Gallery

See also
National Register of Historic Places listings in Litchfield County, Connecticut

Notes

References

External links

Documentary by Chris Szwedo
Skip Barber Racing School (Uses Macromedia Flash)
Lime Rock Park race results at Racing-Reference

Salisbury, Connecticut
Motorsport venues in Connecticut
Tourist attractions in Litchfield County, Connecticut
Sports venues in Litchfield County, Connecticut
American Le Mans Series circuits
IMSA GT Championship circuits
NASCAR tracks
National Register of Historic Places in Litchfield County, Connecticut
Historic districts on the National Register of Historic Places in Connecticut
Event venues on the National Register of Historic Places in Connecticut
Sports venues on the National Register of Historic Places
Parks on the National Register of Historic Places in Connecticut
1957 establishments in Connecticut
Sports venues completed in 1957
Road courses in the United States